Pompeii is the fifth album by German progressive rock group Triumvirat. The band released the album under the name of "The New Triumvirat" due to temporary legal squabbles over the original name from former members, drummer Hans Bathelt and bassist Werner Frangenberg. They were replaced by drummer Curt Cress and bassist Dieter Petereit, both from the band Passport.  This would be the band's last progressive album, due to the pressure of the record company to do more commercial music, to enhance the record sales.

Track listing

"The Earthquake 62 A.D." (Fritz) – 6:18
"Journey of a Fallen Angel" (Fritz) – 6:15
"Viva Pompeii" (Fritz, Cress) – 4:16
"The Time of Your Life" (Sondra and Jürgen Fritz) – 4:35
"The Rich Man and the Carpenter" (Fritz) – 5:57
"Dance on the Volcano" (Fritz) – 3:31
"Vesuvius 79 A.D." (Fritz) – 6:40
"The Hymn" (Fritz) – 7:04
Bonus Track
"The Hymn" (Fritz) (Single Version) – 4:13

Personnel
 Hans-Jürgen Fritz - Keyboards, Hammond organ, Piano, electric piano, Moog Synthesizer, String Synthesizer. 
 Barry Palmer - Vocals 
 Dieter Petereit - bass guitars
 Curt Cress - Drums, percussions

References

1977 albums
Triumvirat albums
Capitol Records albums